The 2016 Tauranga mayoral election was held on 8 October 2016 as part of the New Zealand local elections to elect the Mayor of Tauranga.

Incumbent mayor Stuart Crosby announced in 2014 that he would not seek re-election.

Results
The following table gives the election results:

References

2016 elections in New Zealand
Mayoral elections in New Zealand